The Morph Files is a 1996 British children's stop-motion animated comedy television series featuring Morph. The series was narrated by Neil Morrissey and produced by Aardman Animations. The series is a mix of new animation and old footage from former shows, and features the same cast from The Amazing Adventures of Morph as well as footage from that show. It was originally aired on the BBC in 1996 and was later aired on the ABC in Australia from 1 June 1998 to 13 June 2000, ATV World in Hong Kong, SABC 2 in South Africa and Premiere 12 and Arts Central in Singapore as well as on military television on BFBS and SSVC Television in a number of countries such as Germany, Falkland Islands and Cyprus.

The show is available on the iTunes Store and Amazon Instant Video.

Episodes

Home media releases
In 1998, 20th Century Fox Home Entertainment released the series on VHS in the United States. Each of the three VHS tapes contained four (and five) episodes from the series. In the United Kingdom, the entire series was released on both VHS and DVD by Universal Pictures Home Entertainment whilst other VHS tapes were released by Roadshow Entertainment and ABC Video in Australia.

External links

References

1990s animated comedy television series
1990s British animated television series
1990s British children's television series
1996 British television series debuts
1996 British television series endings
British children's animated adventure television series
British children's animated comedy television series
British children's animated fantasy television series
English-language television shows
BBC children's television shows
Australian Broadcasting Corporation original programming
Aardman Animations
Television series by Aardman Animations